Randy David Wells (born August 28, 1982) is a former Major League Baseball pitcher. He played in Major League Baseball (MLB) for the Toronto Blue Jays and Chicago Cubs.

Professional career

Wells was drafted by the Chicago Cubs in the 38th round (1,143rd overall) of the 2002 MLB draft as a catcher. Wells made the opening day roster and made his debut on April 5, against the Boston Red Sox and pitched a scoreless inning. It was his only appearance for the Blue Jays because he was designated for assignment on April 9, 2008. Wells was returned to the Cubs organization on April 16, and was assigned to the Triple-A Iowa Cubs. On September 9, 2008, the Cubs placed Jon Lieber on the 60-day DL and called up Wells to replace him on the roster. After spring training in 2009, he was returned to the Iowa Cubs. Wells was called up to the Cubs active roster on May 5, 2009 in place of the injured Carlos Zambrano. He made his first start on May 8 against the Milwaukee Brewers and struck out five batters in five scoreless innings, but despite leaving the game with a 2–0 lead, the Cubs' bullpen gave up three runs and eventually lost 3–2. Wells got his first Major League win on June 21, 2009 in a 6–2 win over a struggling and injury plagued Cleveland Indians. On July 29, he became the first Cub rookie pitcher to win seven games since Kerry Wood did it in 1998, when he threw eight shutout innings in a 12–0 Cubs win over the last place Astros. 

Wells was designated for assignment by the Cubs on June 27, 2012. At the time, he was 1–2 with a 5.34 ERA in 12 games (four starts). On October 6, 2012, Wells elected free agency.

On December 6, 2012, Wells signed a minor league contract with the Texas Rangers organization. On April 30, he announced his retirement.

References

External links

1982 births
Living people
American expatriate baseball players in Canada
Sportspeople from Belleville, Illinois
Baseball players from Chicago
Major League Baseball pitchers
Toronto Blue Jays players
Chicago Cubs players
Boise Hawks players
Arizona League Cubs players
Lansing Lugnuts players
Daytona Cubs players
Southwestern Illinois Blue Storm baseball players
West Tennessee Diamond Jaxx players
Iowa Cubs players
Peoria Chiefs players
Round Rock Express players